Tami Reiker is an American cinematographer best known for her work in Lisa Cholodenko's High Art, Gina Prince-Bythewood's Beyond the Lights, and her award-winning work for Carnivàle. For her work on the series' pilot, she became the first woman to win an American Society of Cinematographers Award, as well as the first woman nominated. She was invited to become a member of the Academy of Motion Picture Arts and Sciences in 2005.

Biography
She studied in Tisch School of the Arts, where she decided to become a cinematographer.

Filmography
The Incredibly True Adventure of Two Girls in Love (1995)
Far Harbor (1996)
High Art (1998)
Girl (1998)
The Love Letter (1999)
Pieces of April (2003)
Beyond the Lights (2014)
Shots Fired (2017-) (TV)
The Old Guard (2020)
One Night in Miami (2020)

Accolades

References

External links

American cinematographers
Living people
Tisch School of the Arts alumni
Year of birth missing (living people)
American women cinematographers